Stasinoides is a monotypic genus of Ethiopian huntsman spiders containing the single species, Stasinoides aethiopica. It was first described by Lucien Berland in 1922, and is found in Ethiopia. It has only been recorded twice, and is probably misplaced in this family.

See also
 List of Sparassidae species

References

Endemic fauna of Ethiopia
Monotypic Araneomorphae genera
Sparassidae
Spiders of Africa
Taxa named by Lucien Berland